Satyavadi Vana Vidyalaya (now Satyabadi High School, Sakhigoal) is an Indian school in Sakhigopal, Odisha. It is a pre-secondary and Secondary school, located at Sakhigopal a part of Puri district, in the Indian state of Odisha. It was established by renowned writer and social worker Utkalamani  Gopabandhu Das in 1909 (British India).

History

Established in 1905
 as an experiment in the field of education by Gopabandhu Das, the school started with 19 students. According to Das, schools had to become man-making industries and had to be instrumental in the harmonious development of a child's personality.

As a model for other schools, children from all castes and classes sat, dined, lived and studied together.  There was ample scope in the school for co-curricular activities including social service, exercise, kavi sammelans.  The school aimed to cultivate ideals of patriotism in the hearts of students.

Sir Ashutosh Mukherjee and many other scholars were impressed by its simplicity and naturalistic harmonious approach towards education.

See also

 Education in Odisha
 List of schools in Odisha

References

Further reading

Panda, Abhishek Kumar (May 2021). "Satyabadi Bana Vidyalaya of Pandit Gopabandhu Das: A Case Study in Educational Leadership" (PDF). International Journal of Studies in Public Leadership. 2 (1).

Organizations with year of disestablishment missing
Year of disestablishment missing
1909 establishments in India
Defunct schools in India
Educational institutions established in 1909
Puri district
Schools in Odisha